The Feigned Recoveries Act 1542 (34 & 35 Hen 8 c 20) was an Act of the Parliament of England.

The whole Act, so far as unrepealed, was repealed by section 1 of, and Part III of the Schedule to, the Statute Law (Repeals) Act 1969.

Section 2
In this section, the words from "be it also" to "aforesaide" were repealed by section 1 of, and Part I of the Schedule to, the Statute Law Revision Act 1888.

References
Halsbury's Statutes,

Acts of the Parliament of England (1485–1603)
1542 in law
1542 in England